Heinrich Pesch House (HPH) is a   Catholic academy in Rhine-Neckar, in Ludwigshafen, Germany. The Jesuit-run centre offers lectures, seminars, workshops and conferences. 

The Heinrich Pesch Foundation was founded in 2013 to support the centre and specific programs. A non-profit organization, HPH is supported by the Diocese of Speyer, the Jesuit Order and the Catholic community of Ludwigshafen and Mannheim. 

Heinrich Pesch was a 19th-century Jesuit whose economic theory had a major impact on Rerum Novarum, which was the first Catholic social encyclical.

Programs 
The institute has programs in the fields of "Religion and spirituality", "Ethics in business and society", "Employee representation", "Family education" and Healthcare. It also has a Centre for Ignatian Pedagogy

References  

Jesuit development centres
Non-profit organisations based in Rhineland-Palatinate